The Ashdown Gorge Wilderness is located in eastern Iron County, Utah, United States, within the arid Colorado Plateau region.

Description

The wilderness is within the Dixie National Forest adjacent to Cedar Breaks National Monument and characterized by extremely steep-walled canyons cut through the west rim of the Markagunt Plateau. Rattlesnake Creek and Ashdown Creek flow through the wilderness. The  wilderness area was designated by the U.S. Congress in 1984 and is administered is by the United States Forest Service.

Like the more famous Cedar Breaks National Monument, Ashdown Gorge is known for its multicolored rock formations and plateau-top stands of 1,000-year-old bristlecone pines. The Gorge is named after the family of George Ashdown who set up a sawmill there in 1898.

In 2006, Iron County officials were considering a proposal to expand Cedar Breaks National Monument to include the Ashdown Gorge Wilderness, the private inholdings and nearby Flanigan Arch. With congressional approval the area would be renamed Cedar Breaks National Park.

See also
 Dixie National Forest
 Wilderness
 National Wilderness Preservation System
 List of U.S. Wilderness Areas
 Wilderness Act

References

External links 
 
 
 
 
 

Protected areas of Iron County, Utah
Wilderness areas of Utah
Dixie National Forest